General Satyawant Mallanna Shrinagesh (also known as Satyavant Shrinagule Mallannah) (11 May 1903 – 27 December 1977) was an Indian military officer who served as 3rd Chief of Army Staff of the Indian Army from 14 May 1955 till 7 May 1957. After retirement he served as the Governor of Assam from 14 October 1959 to 12 November 1960 and again from 13 January 1961 to 7 September 1962. He was the Governor of Andhra Pradesh from 8 September 1962 to 4 May 1964 and Governor of Mysore from 4 May 1964 to 2 April 1965. He also served as principal of the Administrative Staff College of India in Hyderabad, Hyderabad State from 1957 to 1959.

Early life and education
Shrinagesh was born in Kolhapur, Maharashtra, the eldest son of Dr. Shrinagesh Mallannah, in a Kannada speaking Lingayat family influenced by Brahma Samaj. His father was the personal physician to H.E.H. Mir Sir Osman Ali Khan Asaf Jah VII, the Nizam of Hyderabad. His mother was Ahalyabai, daughter of Krishnaji Kelavkar. Born in 1903 at Kolhapur, Maharashtra he went to West Buckland School in England and entered the University of Cambridge in 1921.

He was among the earliest batches of Indians to be nominated for the Royal Military College, Sandhurst, in England. He won the Quetta Cup for the best man at arms entering the Indian Army in 1923.

Military career up to 1939
From Sandhurst he was subsequently commissioned a second lieutenant on the Unattached List for the Indian Army on 29 August 1923. After the mandatory one year attachment to a British regiment in India, in his case the 1st Battalion of the North Staffordshire Regiment, he was admitted to the Indian Army and posted to the 2nd Battalion of the 1st Madras Pioneers (erstwhile 64th Pioneers) on 14 October 1924, with which he served mostly in Burma until it was disbanded. In 1933, he joined the 4th battalion 19th Hyderabad Regiment and served in Singapore as its adjutant from December 1935 to December 1939. In December 1939, he was posted as an instructor at the Indian Military Academy, Dehra Dun.

Later career
During the Second World War, from 17 December 1942 till 28 August 1945, Shrinagesh was the Commanding Officer of the 6/19th Hyderabad Regiment (now 6th Kumaon). He then officiated as the Brigade Commander of the 64th Indian Infantry Brigade of the 19th Indian (Dagger) Division in Burma from August 1945. He was selected to go to Germany as Deputy Chief of the Indian Military Mission in November 1945. In that capacity, he also worked as the Economic Adviser & Consul looking after the interests of Indian nationals in Germany and locating missing Prisoners of War (POWs).
 
He was then appointed the first Indian Commandant of the Kumaon Regimental Centre in Agra on 2 October 1946 and served in that capacity till 12 December 1946. He was then chosen to lead the 268th Infantry Brigade British Commonwealth Occupation Force (BCOF) in post World War II Japan and served in that post till 1947. He was also Brigade Commander of the famous Lushai Brigade in Burma in 1947.

On his return from Japan, he was promoted to acting Major-General on 3 September 1947 and was appointed the General Officer Commanding of the Madras Area. From January 1948, he was appointed the Adjutant General at the Army Headquarters and held that post till August of the same year. Promoted to acting Lieutenant-General, he also commanded the 5th Corps (later designated as 15th Corps). He was appointed the overall commander of all troops in Jammu & Kashmir during the 1947–48 Indo-Pak War and held this command till the ceasefire on 1 January 1949. He was chosen as the GOC-in-C Western Command on 15 January 1949 and promoted to the substantive rank of Lieutenant General in 1950. He was then appointed the GOC-in-C Southern Command and held that post, till he assumed charge as the Army Chief on 14 May 1955. He was decorated with the U.S. Legion of Merit in September 1955.

General Shrinagesh retired on 7 May 1957, completing 34 years of distinguished military service. Post retirement, he served as the Governor of Assam from 1959 to 1962, then as the Governor of Andhra Pradesh from 1962 to 1964 and finally as Governor of Mysore (now Karnataka) from 1964 to 1965. From 1957 to 1959, he also served as the Principal of the Administrative Staff College in Hyderabad.

Personal life
In 1934, Shrinagesh married Rajkumari Kochhar (14 April 1915—24 January 2017), with whom he had three sons and two daughters. One son, Satish, also joined the Indian Army, retiring as a major.

Diagnosed with Parkinson's disease in the late 1950s, Shrinagesh succumbed to the disease in the morning of 27 December 1977 at the Army Hospital Delhi Cantonment. Survived by his wife and children, he was cremated with full military honours in New Delhi the following day, with his funeral attended by senior military officers including the Chief of the Army Staff Tapishwar Narain Raina.

Awards and decorations

Dates of rank

Further reading
 Issar, Satish K. (2009). General S. M. Srinagesh, New Delhi: Vision Books,

Notes

External links
 at bharat-rakshak.com

References

1903 births
1977 deaths
Chiefs of Army Staff (India)
People from Kolhapur
Governors of Assam
People of the Indo-Pakistani War of 1947
Indian Army personnel of World War II
Indian generals
Governors of Andhra Pradesh
Governors of Karnataka
Graduates of the Royal Military College, Sandhurst
British Indian Army officers